Cochylis dormitoria is a species of moth of the family Tortricidae. It is found in Canada, including Ontario.

References

Moths described in 1997
Cochylis